Jatuli Laevuo (born 19 May 1995) is a Finnish professional footballer who plays for FC Honka, as a defender.

References

1995 births
Living people
Finnish footballers
Pallohonka players
FC Honka players
Kakkonen players
Ykkönen players
Veikkausliiga players
Association football defenders